Manuel Sanchis may refer to:

Manuel Sanchis i Guarner (1911–1981), Valencian Spanish philologist, historian and writer
Manuel Sanchís Martínez (1938–2017), Spanish footballer prominent during the 1960s
Manuel Sanchís Hontiyuelo (born 1965), Spanish footballer prominent during the 1980s, son of Manuel Sanchis Martínez